Sèvres–Lecourbe is an elevated station of the Paris Métro serving line 6 at the intersection of several streets including the Rue de Sèvres and the Rue Lecourbe in the 15th arrondissement.

This station is one of a small number of elevated Paris Métro stations.  The tracks emerge from underground near the Pasteur station at Rue de Vaugirard and remain elevated through four more stations, crossing the Seine on Pont de Bir-Hakeim and descending underground west of the Seine near the Passy station. Visitors have excellent views of several notable landmarks from this station and its trains.

Location
Elevated above-ground, the station overlooks the Boulevard Garibaldi, west of the Place Henri-Queuille (intersects with the Rues de Sèvres and Lecourbe, Avenue de Breteuil and Boulevard Pasteur) location of the old Sevres gate of the Wall of the Farmers-General. Oriented Approximately along a north-west/south-east axis, it is situated between the Cambronne and Pasteur stations, it is also geographically close to the Ségur metro station on Line 10.

History
The station opened as part of the former Line 2 South on 24 April 1906, when it was extended from Passy to Place d'Italie. On 14 October 1907 Line 2 South was incorporated into Line 5. It was incorporated into line 6 on 12 October 1942.

The Rue de Sèvres was the old road, originally Roman to the village of Sèvres, now a suburb of Paris. The Rue Lecourbe was named after General Claude Lecourbe (1758–1815) who fought in the French Revolution and for Napoleon. Until 1907, the station was called Suffren after the Avenue de Suffren, named after Admiral Pierre André Suffren (1729–1788), who fought the British aggressively during the Seven Years' War (1754 and 1756–1763).

The station was the location of the Barrière de Sèvres, a gate built for the collection of taxation as part of the Wall of the Farmers-General; the gate was built between 1784 and 1788 and demolished in the nineteenth century.

Passenger services

Access
The station has a single entrance called Boulevard Garibaldi, leading to the central median-strip of this boulevard, to the right of no. 94. It opens onto a common area under the viaduct from where access to the platform is by means of stairs or escalators.

Station layout

Platforms
Sèvres-Lecourbe is an elevated metro station of standard configuration. It has two platforms separated by metro tracks, all covered by a glass roof marquee in the style of the stations of the time. The verticals wall are covered on the inside with white ceramic tiles and bricks with geometric patterns on the outside. The advertising frames are white ceramic and the name of the station is written in capital letters on enamelled plates attached to the metal frame. The Motte style seats are red. The lighting is semi-direct, projected onto the ground by blue ceiling lights, on the walls by partially concealed tubes and on the framework by projectors of blue light. Access is via the eastern end.

Bus connections
The station is served by Lines 39, 70 and 89 of the RATP Bus Network and, at night, by Lines N12, N13, N61, N62 and N121 of the Noctilien network.

Culture
The Bourne Ultimatum by Paul Greengrass (2007) is a movie where a scene shows Martin Kreutz (played by Daniel Brühl) coming out of the station.

Nearby
Nearby are the Lycée Buffon and the Necker-Enfants Malades Hospital, the oldest paediatric hospital in the world.

Gallery

References

Paris Métro stations in the 15th arrondissement of Paris
Railway stations in France opened in 1906